Liberman Cristhofer Agámez Urango (born 15 February 1985) is a Colombian volleyball player. He was member of the Colombia men's national volleyball team (2005-2015).

In 2017, he signed a contract with Sporting.

Sporting achievements

National team
 South American Volleyball Championship:
2013, 2015

Club

International competitions
 2008/2009   CEV Cup, with Panathinaikos(runner-up)

National championships
 2005/2006  Greek Championship, with Panathinaikos
 2012/2013  Turkish Championship, with Arkas Spor

National Cups
 2006/2007 Greek Cup , with Panathinaikos
 2007/2008  Greek Cup , with Panathinaikos
 2009/2010  Greek Cup , with Panathinaikos
 2010/2011  Turkish Cup , with Arkas Spor
 2016/2017  Greek Cup , with Olympiacos

National League Cups
 2016/2017  Greek League Cup, with Olympiacos Piraeus

Awards

Individuals
 2008 Greek Cup "Most Valuable Player"
 2009 CEV Cup "Most Valuable Player"
 2009 CEV Cup "Best Scorer"
 2011 CEV Challenge Cup "Most Valuable Player"
 2011 CEV Challenge Cup "Best Scorer"
 2010 Greek Cup "Most Valuable Player"
 2011 Turkish League "Best Scorer"
 2012 Turkish League "Best Scorer"
 2012 Memorial Zdzisław Ambroziak "Best Spiker"
 2013 Turkish League "Most Valuable Player"
 2013 Turkish League "Best Scorer"
 2015 FIVB World Cup – South American Qualification "Most Valuable Player"
 2017 Greek Cup "Most Valuable Player"
 2021 Men's South American Volleyball Championship "Best Spiker"

References

External links
CEV Profile

1985 births
Living people
Colombian men's volleyball players
Panathinaikos V.C. players
Olympiacos S.C. players
Sporting CP volleyball players
Galatasaray S.K. (men's volleyball) players
People from Apartadó
Sportspeople from Antioquia Department
21st-century Colombian people